Kimvula is a territory in the Kongo Central province of the Democratic Republic of the Congo. Its seat is the town of Kimvula.

References

Territories of Kongo Central Province